Bhuvanagiri revenue division (or Bhuvanagiri division) is an administrative division in the Yadadri Bhuvanagiri district of the Indian state of Telangana. It is one of the 2 revenue divisions in the district which consists of 11 mandals under its administration. Bhuvanagiri is the divisional headquarters of the division. The revenue division got modified on 11 October 2011, based on the re-organisation of the districts in the state.

Administration 
The mandals in the Bhuvanagiri division are:

See also 
List of revenue divisions in Telangana
List of mandals in Telangana

References 

Revenue divisions in Telangana
Revenue divisions in Yadadri Bhuvanagiri district